Mario Hermoso Canseco (born 18 June 1995) is a Spanish professional footballer who plays for Atlético Madrid and the Spain national team. Mainly a central defender, he can also operate as a left-back.

Club career

Real Madrid

Born in Madrid, Hermoso joined Real Madrid's youth setup in 2005, aged ten, after starting out at EF Concepción. On 28 September 2012, while still a youth, he appeared with the first team in that year's Trofeo Santiago Bernabéu, coming on as a second-half substitute in an 8–0 rout of Millonarios FC.

In summer 2014, Hermoso was promoted to the C side in the Tercera División, playing 34 matches and scoring two goals. On 16 July 2015, shortly after being assigned to the reserves, he was loaned to Segunda División club Real Valladolid in a season-long deal.

Hermoso made his professional debut on 22 August 2015, starting in a 1–0 away loss against Córdoba CF. Upon returning, he was again assigned to Real's reserves in the Segunda División B.

Espanyol
On 12 July 2017, Hermoso signed a three-year deal with RCD Espanyol. His maiden appearance in La Liga took place on 9 September, playing the full 90 minutes in a 5–0 defeat at FC Barcelona. He scored his first goal in the competition the following 28 January, but also put two past his own net in a 3–2 loss away to CD Leganés.

Atlético Madrid
On 18 July 2019, with only one year left in his contract, Hermoso agreed to a five-year contract with Atlético Madrid for €25 million plus €4 million in add-ons; Espanyol also retained 20% of any future sale of the player, with half of the fee being paid to Real Madrid. He made his league debut on 18 August, playing 28 minutes in the 1–0 home win against Getafe CF.

Hermoso scored his first league goal on 22 December 2020, opening a 2–0 away victory over Real Sociedad. He contributed 31 appearances during the season, as the club won its 11th domestic league.

International career
After playing for Spain at under-19 level, Hermoso was first called by the full side on 8 November 2018, for matches against Croatia and Bosnia and Herzegovina. He made his debut in the latter fixture, featuring the full 90 minutes in the 1–0 friendly win in Las Palmas.

Career statistics

Club

International

Honours
Atlético Madrid
La Liga: 2020–21

References

External links

1995 births
Living people
Spanish footballers
Footballers from Madrid
Association football defenders
La Liga players
Segunda División players
Segunda División B players
Tercera División players
Real Madrid C footballers
Real Madrid Castilla footballers
Real Valladolid players
RCD Espanyol footballers
Atlético Madrid footballers
Spain youth international footballers
Spain international footballers